The System Display and Search Facility (SDSF) component of IBM's mainframe operating system, z/OS, is an interactive user interface that allows users and administrators to view and control various aspects of the mainframe's operation and system resources. Some of the information displayed in SDSF includes Batch job output, Unix processes, scheduling environments, and the status of external devices such as printers and network lines.  SDSF is primarily used to access batch and system log files and dumps.

History 
When it was a field-developed program offering, SDSF was known as the SPOOL Display and Search Facility The word SPOOL was changed to System when it became a program product in the late 1980s.

With z/OS Release 1.9 ,SDSF supports a REXX interface, allowing batch programs to use SDSF facilities. This support includes stem variables containing SDSF-originated information.

Prior to z/OS Release 1.10, SDSF was only supported for use with JES2 and not JES3, although ISV products from Phoenix Software International and Tone Software were available with similar functionality for JES3. At and beyond z/OS Release 1.10, SDSF fully supports JES3, including some new commands (JDS and ODS) to display the data/sets and job output for JES3 jobs.

With the release of z/OS V1R13, SDSF came packed with some interesting features like cursor-sensitive sort or point-and-shoot sort and extensive support for open logs from Rexx and Java-programmed environments.

Features

SDSF is organized as a collection of panels where each panel displays information about a specific aspect of the mainframe's operations. These panels are currently provided:

 LOG: To see the current log of system activity.
 DA: "Display Active users/jobs" or running processes.
 I: Input Queue - shows jobs waiting execution.
 H: Jobs on HOLD - either waiting to be released into Input or Output or actual copies of job JCL (Job Control Language) or previously executed jobs.
 ST: Displays current status of all jobs. Job list can be filtered using the PRE primary command.
 PR: Displays printers.
 INIT: Displays Initiators (areas where jobs execute or run).
 O:  Output Queue
 LINE:  Network Job Entry (NJE) Lines
 SR: System Requests
 MAS: Members in a MAS (Multiple Access Spool) 
 JC: Job Classes
 PS: z/OS UNIX Processes
 RES: WLM ( Workload Manager) Resources
 ENC: Enclaves 
 SE: Scheduling Environments
 PUN:  Punches
 RDR:  Readers          
 NODE: NJE (Network Job Entry) Nodes            
 SO: Spool offload    
 SP: Spool volumes    
 RM: Resource monitor 
 CK: Health checker   
 ULOG: User session log

On the ST panel, SDSF supports the following commands for each batch job. These commands are translated into a JES2 or JES3 command that performs the desired function:
 C: Cancel a running job
 S: Select job (view only)
 SE: Select edit job (view in edit mode)
 SJ: Show job (view original JCL of the job)
 P: Purge a job (remove entirely)

See also
 z/OS operating system, and its originator MVS

References

External links
 IBM System Display and Search Facility

IBM mainframe operating systems